Operation Priboi ( – "Operation 'Coastal Surf) was the code name for the Soviet mass deportation from the Baltic states on 25–28 March 1949. The action is also known as the March deportation by Baltic historians. More than 90,000 Estonians, Latvians and Lithuanians, labeled as "enemies of the people", were deported to forced settlements in inhospitable areas of the Soviet Union. Over 70% of the deportees were either women or children under the age of 16.

Portrayed as a "dekulakization" campaign, the operation was intended to facilitate collectivisation and to eliminate the support base for the armed resistance of the Forest Brothers against the illegal Soviet occupation. The deportation fulfilled its purposes: by the end of 1949, 93% and 80% of the farms were collectivized in Latvia and Estonia. In Lithuania, the progress was slower and the Soviets organized another large deportation known as Operation Osen in late 1951. The deportations were for "eternity" with no way to return. During the de-Stalinization and Khrushchev Thaw, deportees were gradually released and some of them managed to return, though many of their descendants still live in Siberian towns and villages to this day.

Since the general situation in the Soviet Union had improved since the end of the war, this mass deportation did not result in as many casualties as previous deportations, with a reported mortality rate of less than 15 percent. Due to the high death rate of deportees during the first few years of their Siberian exile, caused by the failure of Soviet authorities to provide suitable living conditions at the destinations, whether through neglect or premeditation, some sources consider these deportations an act of genocide. Based on the Martens Clause and the principles of the Nuremberg Charter, the European Court of Human Rights has held that the March deportation constituted a crime against humanity.

Decision 
Collectivisation in the Baltic states was introduced in early 1947, but the progress was slow. Despite new heavy taxes on farmers and intense propaganda, only about 3% of farms in Lithuania and Estonia joined kolkhozes by the end of 1948. Borrowing from the collectivisation experiences of the early 1930s, kulaks were named as the primary obstacle and became targets of repressions.

It is unclear when the idea of a mass deportation was advanced. On 18 January 1949, leaders of all three Baltic republics were called to report to Joseph Stalin. That day, during a session of the Politburo of the Communist Party of the Soviet Union, the decision was made to carry out the deportations. On 29 January, the top secret decision No. 390-138 ss was adopted by the Council of Ministers of the Soviet Union, approving the deportation of kulaks, nationalists, bandits (i.e. Forest Brothers), their supporters and families from Lithuania, Latvia, and Estonia. The decision specified deportee quotas for each republic: 8,500 families or 25,500 people from Lithuania, 13,000 families or 39,000 people from Latvia, and 7,500 families or 22,500 people from Estonia. Lists of kulaks to be deported were to be compiled by each republic and approved by each republic's Council of Ministers. It also listed responsibilities of each Soviet ministry: the Ministry of State Security (MGB) was responsible for gathering the deportees and transporting them to the designated railway stations; the Ministry of Internal Affairs (MVD) was responsible for the transportation to the forced settlements, provision of employment at the destination, and continued surveillance and administration; Ministry of Finance was to allocate sufficient funds (5.60 rubles per person per day of travel); Ministry of Communications was to provide the railway stock cars; Ministries of Trade and Health were to provide food and health care en route to the destination. Given just two months for preparations, the various agencies began marshaling resources.

Preparations 

On 28 February 1949, Viktor Abakumov, the minister of MGB, signed the USSR MGB order No. 0068 for the preparation and execution of the mass deportations. Lieutenant General  commanded the MGB troops while Lieutenant General Sergei Ogoltsov, Deputy Minister of MGB, was in charge of the overall MGB role in the deportation. Burmak set up his headquarters in Riga. The success of the operation depended on its suddenness to prevent mass panic, escape attempts, or retaliations by the Forest Brothers. Therefore, secrecy was of paramount importance.

Compilation of deportee lists 
Special MGB representatives were dispatched to various local offices of MGB to form operative staff that would select the deportees and compile a file on each family. The information was gathered from many different sources, including republican MGB files on "nationalists", local MGB files on "bandits" (i.e. Forest Brothers), local executive committee files and tax records on "kulaks", border guard and navy files on emigrants. Since there was not enough time to investigate people's attitudes or activities during the German occupation, there were many contradictory cases where Communist activists were deported but Nazi collaborators were not. This led to widespread confusion and uncertainty as to what offenses warranted deportation and what actions could guarantee safety. Deportees often blamed local informants of MGB who, they believed, acted out of petty revenge or greed, but Estonian researchers found that deportee lists were compiled with minimal local input.

List of kulaks were to be prepared by local executive committees and officially approved by the Council of Ministers, but due to the tight deadline and top secret nature of the task, local MGB offices compiled their own lists of kulaks. This caused much confusion during the operation. Local MGB offices would prepare summary certificates for each family and send them for approval to the republican MGB office. For example, by 14 March, Estonian MGB approved summary certificates for 9,407 families (3,824 kulaks and 5,583 nationalists and bandits) which created a reserve of 1,907 families above the quota. Overall, due to the lack of time, the files on deportees were often incomplete or incorrect. Therefore, from April to June, retrospective corrections were made – new files were added for people deported but not on deportee lists and files of those who escaped deportations were removed.

Deployment of additional troops 

Due to the immense scale of the Operation Priboi, which spanned three Soviet republics, considerable resources were needed. MGB needed to assemble personnel, transport vehicles, and communication equipment all the while keeping the operation secret. MGB also needed to draw up plans for where the operative groups to be deployed and how the deportees to be transported to the railway stations. Local MGB officials, who numbered 634 in Estonia, were not sufficient and 1,193 MGB operatives from other parts of the Soviet Union were transferred to Estonia alone. In addition to the troops already stationed in Latvia and Estonia, an additional 8,850 soldiers were deployed to Estonia and Latvia from other parts of the Soviet Union to take part in the operation. They arrived to the republics between 10–15 March. They were not told of their actual mission until later and their arrival was explained as a military exercise.

An additional 5,025 submachine guns and 1,900 rifles were brought in to ensure that the operatives were sufficiently armed. Telecommunications was a vital component to ensure smooth running of the operation, thus the MGB commandeered all civilian telephone exchanges for the duration and brought in an extra 2,210 MGB communications personnel. 4,437 freight railway cars were delivered. A total of 8,422 trucks were organised. 5,010 civilian trucks were commandeered and the remaining vehicles were military origin, including 1,202 imported from the Leningrad Military District, 210 from the Byelorussian Military District and 700 from Internal Troops. These additional vehicles were stationed just outside the border of the Baltic Republics in advance so as not to raise suspicion and sent in at the start of the operation.

The preparation on the MVD side was slower. USSR MVD order No. 00225 instructing various branches of MVD to prepare for the deportation and to assist the MGB was issued only on 12 March. Six months later, an internal review commission criticized the delay. Special representatives of MVD arrived to local districts only on 18–22 March.

Implementation

Assembly of operative teams 

The original order by the Council of Ministers of the Soviet Union scheduled the deportation between 20–25 March, but the start of the operation was delayed to the early morning of 25 March. Operatives were deployed to the countryside starting 21 March. A deportation of a family was carried out by a small nine–ten-man operative team, which included three USSR MGB agents ("troika"), two republican Destruction Battalion soldiers and four or five local Communist Party activists who were armed by the MGB. Since the operatives were assembled from other parts of the Soviet Union, they were not familiar with local geography and that became a frequent reason for the failure to deport the designated family. Care was taken to ensure that each operative team included at least one member of the Communist Party of the Soviet Union or Komsomol to act as an ideological supervisors of the team.

Recruitment of the local Communist Party activists by partorgs was the last step. Since they needed to assemble a large force in a very short time, they used various excuses (such as discussion of spring sowing or cinema viewing) to call meetings of the Party or Komsomol. The activists were taken to the deportations directly from these meetings; others not selected for the operation were detained to preserve secrecy until its completion. The activists stayed in the household taking inventory of the confiscated property while soldiers escorted the deportees to the train stations. The activists were also important in explaining who was deported and why. Since these were locals, they were often familiar to the deportees and these activists, not the unknown soldiers, became the face and name of the deportations creating social tensions.

Round up of families 
On average, each operative team was assigned three to four specific families they needed to deport. After locating the assigned farm, the team was to search the premises, identify all residents, and complete their files. The families were allowed to pack some of their personal belongings (clothes, dishes, agricultural tools, domestic utensils) and food. Property left behind was transferred to kolkhozes or sold to cover state expenses. Where available, the ownership of real estate and land was restored to the deportees and their heirs after the dissolution of the Soviet Union. Unlike the June deportation in 1941, the families deported in 1949 were not separated. People were transported to the train stations by various means – horse carts, trucks, or cargo ships (from Estonian islands of Saaremaa and Hiiumaa).

As the people had already experienced mass deportations, they knew the signs (such as arrival of fresh troops and vehicles) and attempted to hide. Therefore, the Soviets set up ambushes, tracked down and interrogated relatives, carried out mass identity documents checks, etc. Against regulations, MGB operatives would deliver children without parents to the train stations hoping that the parents would voluntarily show up. Not all fugitives were caught by such measures and later, in Lithuania, smaller actions and deportations were organized to locate those that escaped the first Operation Priboi in March.

Railway transportation 

Once loaded onto the trains, the deportees became the responsibility of the MVD. The loading stations needed special supervision and security to prevent escapes therefore they were, if possible, away from towns to prevent the gathering of deportee family members, friends, or onlookers. MVD also recruited informants from among the deportees and placed people categorized as flight risk under heavier guard. The train cars were mostly standard 20-ton freight cars with no amenities. The last train left Lithuania in the evening of 30 March.

Not only the stations, but also the railways were patrolled. In Estonia, the patrols were attacked in three separate incidents. One of these incidents near Püssi resulted in the derailment of three railway cars on March 27. The patrols, among other things, picked up letters thrown out the train window by the deportees. The letters would usually inform about the deportation, send farewells to relatives and homeland, complain about conditions on the train, and express anti-Soviet feelings. On average, the train ride lasted about two weeks, but could take almost a month. For example, a train left Võru on March 29 and arrived to Makaryevo station in Svirsk on April 22. According to an MVD report from 30 May, from Estonian deportees, 45 people died en route and 62 were removed from the trains due to medical conditions.

Results 

Some 72% of deportees were women and children under the age of 16. Kruglov, the USSR Interior Minister, reported to Stalin on May 18 that 2,850 were "decrepit solitary old people", 1,785 children without parents to support them, and 146 disabled. About 15% of the deportees were over the age of 60. There were people of very old age; for example, a 95-year-old woman was deported from Švenčionys District, Lithuania.

Aftermath 
The deportation was a shock to Estonian and Latvian societies. The rate of collectivisation jumped from 8% to 64% from 20 March to 20 April in Estonia and from 11% to more than 50% from 12 March to 9 April in Latvia. By the end of the year, 80% Estonian and 93% Latvian farms joined kolkhozes. In Lithuania, which had the stronger Forest Brother movement and already experienced a mass deportation in May 1948 (Operation Vesna), the impact was not as great and the collectivisation rate was 62% by the end of 1949. Therefore, the Soviets organized another large deportation from Lithuania in April 1949 specifically targeting those who had escaped the Operation Priboi (approx. 3,000 people) and another mass deportation known as Operation Osen in late 1951 (more than 20,000 people). 

The additional troops brought for the operation left Latvia and Estonia on 3–8 April. By a decree of the Presidium of the USSR Supreme Soviet, orders and medals for the successful completion of Operation Priboi were to be granted. 75 people were awarded the Order of the Red Banner, their names published in Pravda on 25 August 1949. On 26 August, Pravda published the names of 17 people awarded the Order of the Great Patriotic War, First Class for courage and heroism displayed during the operation.

The deportees were exiled "for eternity" and no right of return to their home, with the penalty of twenty years of hard labour for attempted escapes. 138 new commandantures were set up to monitor the deportees, censor their mail, and prevent escapes. Deportees were not permitted to leave their designated area and were required to report to the local MVD commandant once a month, failure of which was a punishable offense. The deportees were generally given jobs in kolkhozes and sovkhozes, with a small handful employed in forestry and manufacturing. Living conditions varied greatly by destination, but there was housing shortage almost everywhere. Deportees lived in barracks, farm sheds, mud huts, or became tenants of locals. The conditions were also very dependent on how many working age people there were in a family as bread was allotted based on workdays, not headcount. Some relatives from home were able to send food packages that alleviated the worst hunger. By 31 December 1950, 4,123 or 4.5% of the deportees died, including 2,080 children. During this same period, 903 children were born into exile.

See also 
 Soviet deportations from Estonia
 Soviet deportations from Latvia
 Soviet deportations from Lithuania
 Commemoration Day for the Victims of Communist Genocide
 Swedish extradition of Baltic soldiers

Notes

References

Bibliography

External links 
"Undesirable Elements": How Stalin Deported Nearly 100,000 From The Baltics In Operation "Priboi" March 25, 2019. Radio Free Europe/Radio Liberty. Retrieved: March 25, 2020
LTV documentary recounts legend of Edgars Kauliņš and deportations of 1949. March 25, 2020. Public Broadcasting of Latvia. Retrieved: March 25, 2020

1949 in Estonia
1949 in Latvia
1949 in Lithuania
Deportation
Deportation from Latvia
1949 in the Soviet Union
Forced migration in the Soviet Union
Crimes against humanity
Occupation of the Baltic states
March 1949 events in Europe
Anti-Estonian sentiment
Anti-Latvian sentiment